Fábio Flor de Azevedo (born 16 January 1981), simply known as Fábio Flor, is a Brazilian former professional footballer who played as a centre-back.

Club career
Between 2005 and 2008, Fábio played for Terengganu FA in the Malaysia Super League. Fábio played for Bahrain SC in the Bahraini Second Division during the 2015–16 season. On 9 August 2016, he returned to fellow Second Division side Busaiteen.

References

1981 births
Living people
People from Macaé
Sportspeople from Rio de Janeiro (state)
Brazilian footballers
Association football central defenders
Coritiba Foot Ball Club players
Rio Branco Football Club players
Independente Futebol Clube players
Macaé Esporte Futebol Clube players
Terengganu FC players
Emirates Club players
Al-Sahel SC (Kuwait) players
Al Mabarra Club players
Busaiteen Club players
Terengganu F.C. II players
Bahrain SC players
Brazilian expatriate footballers
Brazilian expatriate sportspeople in Malaysia
Brazilian expatriate sportspeople in the United Arab Emirates
Brazilian expatriate sportspeople in Kuwait
Brazilian expatriate sportspeople in Lebanon
Brazilian expatriate sportspeople in Bahrain
Expatriate footballers in Malaysia
Expatriate footballers in the United Arab Emirates
Expatriate footballers in Kuwait
Expatriate footballers in Lebanon
Expatriate footballers in Bahrain